Summer Daze may refer to:

 "Summer Daze", a song by the alternative rock group Luscious Jackson on the 1999 album Electric Honey
 Summer Daze EP, 1995 EP by Basement Jaxx

 "Summer Daze" , a song by the pop punk group All Time Low on the 2020 album Wake Up, Sunshine